The Asian Men's Youth Handball Championship is the official competition for youth men's national handball teams of Asia, and takes place every two years. In addition to crowning the Asian champions, the tournament also serves as a qualifying tournament for the Youth World Championship.

Summary

Medal table

Participating nations

See also 
Asian Men's Handball Championship
Asian Men's Junior Handball Championship
Asian Women's Handball Championship
Asian Women's Junior Handball Championship
Asian Women's Youth Handball Championship

References

Results

External links
Asian Handball Federation

Asian Handball Championships
Youth handball
Men's sports competitions in Asia
Youth sport in Asia
Recurring sporting events established in 2005
2005 establishments in Asia